Thomas Tollemache, also spelt Talmash or Tolmach, (c. 16511694) was an English soldier and Member of Parliament. Beginning his military career in 1673, in 1686 he resigned his commission in protest at the introduction of Catholic officers into the English army by James II. A supporter of military intervention by the Protestant William of Orange, in early 1688 he joined a regiment of the Anglo-Scots Brigade, a long established mercenary unit in the Dutch army. 

In November 1688, he accompanied William to England in the Glorious Revolution and shortly afterwards became colonel of the Coldstream Guards, and MP for Malmesbury. He fought in Flanders and Ireland during the Nine Years' War, as well as being appointed Governor of Portsmouth in 1690 and elected for Chippenham in 1692.

In 1694, he was badly wounded at the Battle of Camaret; he died of his injuries on 12 June and was buried in St Mary's Church, Helmingham.

Personal details
Thomas Tollemache was born in 1651, second son of Sir Lionel Tollemache (1624-1669) of Helmingham Hall, Suffolk and Elizabeth, 2nd Countess of Dysart, whose second husband was John Maitland, Duke of Lauderdale. Tollemache never married.

Career

According to his own account, Tollemache spent several years travelling in Europe before returning to England in 1668, when he attended Queens' College, Cambridge, followed by legal training at the Inner Temple. Details of his early military career are unclear; by 1673 he was based in Germany during the Franco-Dutch War, where he served with John Churchill. 

In 1678, he became a captain in the Coldstream Guards, with which he served with the Tangier Garrison, along with Percy Kirke and Charles Trelawny. Although he lost his commission after fighting a duel, in 1685 he was appointed lieutenant-colonel in the newly formed Royal Fusiliers. In 1686, he resigned in protest at the admission of Catholic officers by James II, and became a leading member of the "Treason Club", which supported armed intervention by the Protestant William of Orange on behalf of James' daughter Mary II of England. 

He was also associated with the Association of Protestant Officers, whose members included Trelawny, Churchill and Kirke, all of whom opposed James. In early 1688, he joined one of the regiments in the Anglo-Scots Brigade, a long established mercenary unit in the Dutch army and accompanied William of Orange during the November 1688 Glorious Revolution. He was made governor of Portsmouth and colonel of the Coldstream Guards, as well as being elected MP for Malmesbury in 1689.

His regiment was posted to Flanders during the Nine Years' War, seeing action at the Battle of Walcourt in August 1689. During 1691, he served in Ireland as a major general, fighting at the Battle of Aughrim and the sieges of Athlone and Limerick. Following the Treaty of Limerick which ended the war, he returned to Flanders where he took part in the battles of Steenkirk and Landen. 

In 1694 Tollemache led an assault on the port of Brest; warned of the proposed attack, the French under Sébastien Le Prestre de Vauban reinforced the garrison and strengthened the defences. The ensuing Battle of Camaret was disastrous for the English who were repulsed with heavy losses; Tollemache was wounded and later died of his injuries in Plymouth on 12 June 1694. He was buried in the church of St Mary's at Helmingham.

References

Sources
 
 
  

1651 births
1694 deaths
People from Mid Suffolk District
Coldstream Guards officers
Royal Fusiliers officers
English generals
Younger sons of earls
Younger sons of baronets
Williamite military personnel of the Williamite War in Ireland
British military personnel of the Nine Years' War
17th-century English soldiers
Thomas Tollemache
English MPs 1689–1690
English MPs 1690–1695
Soldiers of the Tangier Garrison
Alumni of Queens' College, Cambridge
Military personnel from Suffolk
British military personnel killed in action in the Nine Years' War